Short Pine Creek is a  long first-order tributary to Long Pine Creek in Rock County, Nebraska.  This is the only stream of this name in the United States.

Watershed

See also

List of rivers of Nebraska

References

Rivers of Rock County, Nebraska
Rivers of Nebraska